HSwMS Berserk was one of seven s monitors built for the Swedish Navy in the mid-1870s. The ship had an uneventful career and was sold in 1919 for conversion into a fuel oil barge.

Design and description
The Hildur-class monitors were designed for the defense of Lake Mälaren and the Stockholm archipelago. Berserks crew numbered 48 officers and men. The ship had rudders at bow and stern.

Berserk had a pair of two-cylinder horizontal-return connecting-rod steam engines, each driving a single propeller using steam from two cylindrical boilers. Hildurs carried  of coal.

The monitors were equipped with one  M/69 rifled breech loader, mounted in a long, fixed, oval-shaped gun turret. They were rearmed with a  quick-firing gun as well as three  quick-firing guns sometime in the 1890s or the early 1900s.

Construction and service
Berserk was launched in 1875 by Motala Verkstad at Norrköping. She was sold in 1919 and converted into an oil barge.

References

Bibliography
 
 
 

1874 ships
Ships built in Norrköping
Hildur-class monitors